The Microsoft Lumia 435 is a mobile phone developed by Microsoft for emerging markets. It was introduced in January 2015 to compete with Google's Android One. The phone offers Lumia Denim out of the box and comes pre-installed with Lumia Selfie.

It is available in the US for $50.

Specifications

Hardware 

The Lumia 435 has a 4.0-inch IPS LCD display, dual-core 1.2 GHz Cortex-A7 Qualcomm Snapdragon 200 processor, 1 GB of RAM and 8 GB of internal storage that can be expanded using microSD cards up to 256 GB. The phone has a 1560 mAh Li-Ion battery, 2-megapixel rear camera and VGA front-facing camera. It is available in black, white, green and orange.

Software 

The Lumia 435 ships with Windows Phone 8.1 and can be updated to Windows 10 Mobile.

See also 

Microsoft Lumia
Microsoft Lumia 532

References

External links 
Microsoft Lumia 430 Dual SIM

Microsoft Lumia
Mobile phones introduced in 2015
Discontinued smartphones
Windows Phone devices
Microsoft Lumia 435
Mobile phones with user-replaceable battery